Karen Dale Williams Morse is a inorganic chemist. She was president of Western Washington University from 1993 until 2008, and was named the Bowman Distinguished Professor in 2014. She is an elected fellow of the American Association for the Advancement of Science.

Education and career 
Morse has a B.A. from Denison University (1962), and an M.S. and Ph.D. from the University of Michigan. During her Ph.D. she worked on Lewis acids. Morse joined the faculty of Utah State University in 1968 in the department of chemistry and biochemistry, and subsequently became the department head, the dean, and was named provost in 1989. In 1993 she moved to Western Washington University where she was president until 2008. In 2014, Morse was named the Bowman Distinguished Professor at Western Washington University.

Morse's early research centered on the production and properties of phosphines. She also worked on borohydrides, phosphite, metal-phosphorus compounds, aryl phosphines Morse also led the professional training committee at the American Chemical Society where she expanded on options for recognizing educators who teach chemistry at the undergraduate and high school level.

Selected publications

Awards and honors 
Morse was elected a fellow of the American Association for the Advancement of Science in 1986. In 1997 she received the Garvan–Olin Medal for scientific accomplishments by a woman chemist from the American Chemical Society. In 2012 Western Washington University named the chemistry building the Karen W. Morse Hall in recognition of her. In 2021, Utah State University awarded her with an honorary doctorate.

References 

Living people
Inorganic chemists
Utah State University faculty
Western Washington University faculty
Heads of universities and colleges in the United States
Fellows of the American Association for the Advancement of Science
Year of birth missing (living people)
Women heads of universities and colleges
21st-century American women scientists
20th-century American chemists
20th-century American women scientists
American women chemists
21st-century American chemists
Academics from Bellingham, Washington
Scientists from Bellingham, Washington